Felicia Sonmez is an American journalist. She began her career as a foreign correspondent in Beijing. In 2010, she joined The Washington Post as a political reporter. She is known for her social media activity, for which she was fired from the Post in June 2022.

Early life 
Sonmez received a B.A. in government from Harvard College in 2005.

Career
After studying for the Foreign Service, Sonmez instead moved to Beijing to teach English where she began working for Japanese newspaper Yomiuri Shimbun. She joined The Washington Post as a political reporter in 2010. She was a foreign correspondent in Beijing for Agence France-Presse and an editor for The Wall Street Journal.

While a national political reporter for the Post in January 2020, Sonmez was placed on administrative leave after tweeting about the sexual assault charge against Kobe Bryant shortly after his death. The Post later concluded that she did not violate its social media policy.

Sonmez again drew attention in July 2021 after having sued The Washington Post, alleging that the paper had discriminated against her by blocking her from covering sexual assault cases after she came forward as a survivor. The lawsuit was subsequently dismissed.

Sonmez was then fired, in June 2022, after criticizing a colleague, Dave Weigel,  on Twitter for retweeting a misogynistic joke. Weigel had retweeted a tweet from YouTuber Cam Harless, who joked, "Every girl is bi. You just have to figure out if it's polar or sexual.", which Sonmez in turn criticized in a tweet of her own. Weigel subsequently apologized and was suspended for a month without pay.

Her firing spurred debate over social media policies for reporters, after the termination letter accused her of "insubordination, maligning your coworkers online and violating the Post's standards on workplace collegiality and inclusivity".  With the guild's support she sought to get her job back.

Personal life 
Sonmez resides in Washington, D.C.

References 

American women journalists
The Washington Post journalists
Living people
Year of birth missing (living people)
21st-century American journalists
21st-century American women writers
Harvard College alumni